Wooden Boy is a small island in Khövsgöl Lake, Mongolia, called Dalan Modon Khuis (Далайн-Модон-Хуйс, "Forest Navel in the Sea") in Mongolian.  The island is roughly elliptical, measuring 3 km east–west and 2 km north–south.  It is located about 11 km from the lake's eastern shore, and 50 km north of the town of Hatgal.

The island rises out of the lake as a rounded bulge, reaching 174 m above the water surface. It is uninhabited and mostly covered by dense deciduous forest. There are claims that a lamasery existed on the island in the 1920s, but it was destroyed in a fire in 1986.

References

Geography of Mongolia